The Burmese government recognizes Buddhist monks who have successfully passed the Tipitakadhara Tipitakakovida Selection Examinations as "Sāsana Azani" (သာသနာ့အာဇာနည်), from Pali . Since the examination's initial inception in 1948, only 15 monks have been recognized as "Sāsana Azani" as of 2020. Sasana Azani monks are bestowed the following titles: Tipiṭakadhara (Bearer of the "Spoken Tipitaka") and Tipiṭakakovida (Bearer of the "Written Tipitaka").

As of 2020, monks recognized as "Sāsana Azani" include:

See also 

 Agga Maha Pandita
 Burmese Buddhist titles
 Monastic examinations
 Monastic schools in Myanmar
 Pāli Canon
 Pariyatti
 Thathanabaing of Burma
 Tipitakadhara Tipitakakovida Selection Examinations

References 

Lists of people associated with religion